Small Island is an island 1 nautical mile (1.9 km) long, lying 3 nautical miles (6 km) south of Intercurrence Island in the Christiania Islands, in the northeast part of the Palmer Archipelago. Though the origin of this name is unknown, it has appeared on maps for over 100 years and its usage has been established internationally.

See also 
 List of Antarctic and sub-Antarctic islands

Islands of the Palmer Archipelago